{{DISPLAYTITLE:C20H26O2}}
The molecular formula C20H26O2 (molar mass: 298.41 g/mol, exact mass: 298.19328) may refer to:

 Atamestane, an aromatase inhibitor
 Benzestrol
 Cyclodiol, a synthetic estrogen
 Dimethyltrienolone
 Methestrol
 Norethisterone
 Noretynodrel, a progestin
 RU-2309
 8β-VE2